The Trinidad and Tobago Chess Championships are the annual individual National Chess championships of Trinidad and Tobago. Although chess was being played in Trinidad and Tobago from 1922 or earlier, the first men's tournament took place in 1937. 

Christo Cave is the player with the most wins to his credit, having won 13 titles.
However, several other players have managed to pull off multiple wins: Ryan Harper has 8 titles, George E. C. Stanford has 6, Frederick Edward Brassington has 5, Fred Sabga has 4, and Carl Brown and Shawn Tavares each have 3 titles.

There is also an annual National Women's Championship. Aditi Soondarsingh has won a record nine titles.

NOTE: The table below lists only the years when tournaments took place. There were no chess tournaments in Trinidad and Tobago in 1938, 1940, 1941, 1943, 1960, 1962, and 1963.

List of women's champions

References 

Trinidad and Tobago Newsday Newspaper Report on Trinidad and Tobago Chess Championship

External links 
 Official Website of the Trinidad and Tobago Chess Association
 Trinidad & Tobago at the Chess Olympics
  Chess Drum Report on Trinidad & Tobago Chess Players
Chess Drum Report on Trinidad & Tobago Chess Players
FIDE on  Cecil Lee
Official Website of the Trinidad and Tobago Chess Foundation

Trinidad and Tobago
Chess in Trinidad and Tobago
Recurring sporting events established in 1937
1937 in chess